The 2017–18 Providence Friars men's basketball team represented Providence College in the 2017–18 NCAA Division I men's basketball season. The Friars, led by seventh-year head coach Ed Cooley, played their home games at the Dunkin' Donuts Center as members of the Big East Conference. They finished the season 21–14, 10–8 in Big East play to finish in a three-way tie for third place. As the No. 5 seed in the Big East tournament, they defeated Creighton and No. 1-seeded Xavier in back-to-back overtime games to advance to the championship game. In a third straight overtime game, the Friars fell to Villanova in the championship game. They received an at-large bid to the NCAA tournament as the No. 10 seed in the West region where they lost to Texas A&M in the first round.

Previous season
The Friars finished the 2016–17 season 20–13, 10–8 in Big East play to finish in a four-way tie for third place. As the No. 3 seed in the Big East tournament, they lost in the quarterfinals to Creighton. They received an at-large bid to the NCAA tournament as a No. 11 seed where they lost to USC in the First Four.

Offseason

Departures

2017 recruiting class

Preseason
Prior to the season, Providence was picked to finish fourth in a poll of Big East coaches.

Roster

Schedule and results

|-
!colspan=9 style=| Exhibition

|-
!colspan=9 style=| Non-conference regular season

|-
!colspan=9 style=|Big East regular season

|-
!colspan=9 style=| Big East tournament

|-
!colspan=9 style=| NCAA tournament

  Game was suspended with 13:03 left in the 2nd half due to unsafe floor conditions and resumed at noon on February 22 at Alumni Hall.

References

Providence
Providence Friars men's basketball seasons
Providence
Providence
Providence